In geometry of the Euclidean plane, the 3-4-6-12 tiling is one of 20 2-uniform tilings of the Euclidean plane by regular polygons, containing regular triangles, squares, hexagons and dodecagons, arranged in two vertex configuration: 3.4.6.4 and 4.6.12.

It has hexagonal symmetry, p6m, [6,3], (*632). It is also called a demiregular tiling by some authors.

Geometry
Its two vertex configurations are shared with two 1-uniform tilings:

It can be seen as a type of diminished rhombitrihexagonal tiling, with dodecagons replacing periodic sets of hexagons and surrounding squares and triangles. This is similar to the Johnson solid, a diminished rhombicosidodecahedron, which is a rhombicosidodecahedron with faces removed, leading to new decagonal faces. The dual of this variant is shown to the right (deltoidal hexagonal insets).

Related k-uniform tilings of regular polygons
The hexagons can be dissected into 6 triangles, and the dodecagons can be dissected into triangles, hexagons and squares.

Circle Packing 
This 2-uniform tiling can be used as a circle packing. Cyan circles are in contact with 3 other circles (2 cyan, 1 pink), corresponding to the V4.6.12 planigon, and pink circles are in contact with 4 other circles (1 cyan, 2 pink), corresponding to the V3.4.6.4 planigon. It is homeomorphic to the ambo operation on the tiling, with the cyan and pink gap polygons corresponding to the cyan and pink circles (mini-vertex configuration polygons; one dimensional duals to the respective planigons). Both images coincide.

Dual tiling 
The dual tiling has right triangle and kite faces, defined by face configurations: V3.4.6.4 and V4.6.12, and can be seen combining the deltoidal trihexagonal tiling and kisrhombille tilings.

Notes

References
 Keith Critchlow, Order in Space: A design source book, 1970, pp. 62–67
 Ghyka, M. The Geometry of Art and Life, (1946), 2nd edition, New York: Dover, 1977. Demiregular tiling #15
  pp. 35–43
  p. 65
 Sacred Geometry Design Sourcebook: Universal Dimensional Patterns, Bruce Rawles, 1997. pp. 36–37

External links 
 
 
 
 In Search of Demiregular Tilings, Helmer Aslaksen
 n-uniform tilings  Brian Galebach, 2-Uniform Tiling 1 of 20

Euclidean plane geometry
Tessellation